OPK Oboronprom was a Russian aerospace holding company. The company was involved in helicopter production, engine production, air-defenсe systems, complex radio-electronic systems and leasing. Russian Helicopters, Oboronprom’s helicopter manufacturing group is the leading Russian designer and manufacturer of rotary-wing aircraft equipment.

Oboronprom was dissolved in January 2018. All of its assets were transferred to Rostec.

Ownership
The capital structure of the company is as follows:
 50.24% Rostec.
 38.44% Russian Federation.
  4.73% RSK MiG.
  4.41% Republic of Tatarstan.
  1.81% Rosoboronexport.
  0.36% Rostvertol.

Sanctions

In March 2022, as a result of the 2022 Russian invasion of Ukraine the EU imposed sanctions on OPK Oboronprom.

Organisation
As of 2016, Oboronprom has stakes in or controls the following entities:

 Stankoprom
 Avtocomponents
 United Engine Corporation
 Russian Helicopters
 Stankoimport
 St. Petersburg OJSC Red October
 Ural Works of Civil Aviation
 Center for Management of Non-core Assets OPK Oboronprom
 Perm Motors - Real Estate
 Savelovsky Machine Building Plant
 Arsenyev Aviation Company Progress
 Moscow Helicopter Plant
 Ulan-Ude Aviation Plant
 Stupino Machine-Building Production Enterprise
 Kamov
 Kazan Helicopter Plant
 Moscow Machine Building Plant named after V.V. Chernyshev
 Ufa Engine-Building Production Association
 NPP Motor
 JSC Kuznetsov
 Helicopter Service Company
 NPO Saturn
 Klimov
 Kumertau Aviation Production Enterprise
 ODK-STAR
 Aviadvigatel
 Center of Technological Competence Blades of gas turbine engines
 UDK-Perm Motors
 Instrumental Plant-PM
 REMOS-Perm Motors
 Railwayman-Perm Motors
 Metalist - Perm Motors
 Energetik - Perm Motors
 Motorservice-PM
 ODK-Gas Turbines
 Aviation gearboxes and transmissions - Perm motors
 P.J.J. Ummels Beheer B.V.
 ODK Gas Turbines B.V.
 Metalist-Samara
 Volzhsky Diesel named after Maminykh
 MAG-RT
 LIC Servicing Company
 International Helicopter Programs
 Integrated Helicopter Services
 International RotorCraft Services FZC
 Rostov Helicopter Production Complex
 Rostvertol
 BP Technologies
 Procurement and Logistics Center
 Omsk Motor-Building Design Bureau
 Management Company Vereiskaya 29
 12 Aircraft Repair Plant
 356 aircraft repair plant
 419 aircraft repair plant
 150 aircraft repair plant
 810 aircraft repair plant
 218 Aviation Repair Plant
 Aramil Aircraft Repair Plant
 570 aircraft repair plant
 712 Aircraft Repair Plant
 Research and Production Center for Gas Turbine Construction Salyut
 Kazan Optical and Mechanical Plant

Products

Helicopters
Russian Helicopters' products include:
Kamov Ka-27
Kamov Ka-31
Kamov Ka-52
Kamov Ka-62
Kamov Ka-226
Kazan Ansat
Mil Mi-8
Mil Mi-17
Mil Mi-24
Mil Mi-26
Mil Mi-28
Mil Mi-34
Mil Mi-38
Mil Mi-54
VRT500

A fifth generation helicopter is currently under development.

See also

 "Russia to Gather Mil Helicopter Units Under Centralized Control." Defense News. May 5, 2005.
 "To Compete With Foreign Producers, Russian Helicopter Manufacturers Are to Unite." Interfax. January 25, 2006.
 Oboronprom targets Ukrainian company as helicopter consolidation continues Jane's Defence Industry, 23 August 2006

References

External links
 Official site

 
Aerospace companies of Russia
Holding companies of Russia
Companies based in Moscow
Defunct manufacturing companies of Russia